Veronika Major (born 19 March 1997) is a Hungarian sports shooter. She competed in the women's 10 metre air pistol event at the 2020 Summer Olympics.

References

External links
 

1997 births
Living people
Hungarian female sport shooters
Olympic shooters of Hungary
Shooters at the 2020 Summer Olympics
Sportspeople from Keszthely
European Games competitors for Hungary
Shooters at the 2019 European Games
21st-century Hungarian women